The Strumica (Macedonian and , ; also transliterated Strumitsa or Strumitza) or Strumeshnitsa is a river in North Macedonia and Bulgaria. It runs through the town of Strumica and flows into the river Struma.

The Strumica takes its source from the Plačkovica mountain in Radoviš municipality in North Macedonia, running south in a deep valley and then known as the Stara Reka. It then enters the Radoviš Valley and runs through the eponymous town of Radoviš. Afterwards the Strumica runs southeastwards through the Strumica Valley (Vasilevo, Strumica and Novo Selo municipality), passing through the town of Strumica and turning east to enter Bulgaria south of Zlatarevo. A wide meandering valley follows until the river flows into the Struma as a right tributary northeast of Mitino, not far from Rupite.

The river has a total length of 114 km, of which 81 km in North Macedonia and 33 km in Bulgaria. It is Struma's largest tributary.

External links
 

Rivers of North Macedonia
Rivers of Bulgaria
International rivers of Europe
Landforms of Blagoevgrad Province